Klong song na (or ) is a Thai barrel drum. Song na means "two faces", and the drum has two heads that are played with the hands. It is used primarily in the piphat ensemble.

See also
Traditional Thai musical instruments
Klong khaek
Klong thad

Thai musical instruments
Hand drums